Qidong Street Japanese Houses is located in the Zhongzheng District of Taipei, Taiwan. During the Qing Dynasty, Qidong Street was a major lane for transporting rice from the Taipei basin to harbours along the river.  Prior to the construction of the Taipei City Walls in 1884, one could travel from Bangkah (today's Wanhua District) past the East Gate area and along Qidong Street which joined Bade Road, leading to modern-day Songshan, Nangang, and eventually Keelung.

The history of Qidong spans the Qing era, the Japanese era, and contemporary times. The group of dwellings, located in the center of a modern-day residential district for city officials, housed Japanese civil servants and later provided housing for Republic of China central government figures.

During Japanese rule, the area belonged to the Saiwaichō civil servant housing group (幸町職務官舍群), of which most of the architecture dates from the 1920s to the 1940s. The buildings feature distinctly Japanese architectural features and their overall layout remains largely complete, a state rarely seen in the current day. The house at #11, Lane 53, Qidong Street, currently the Taipei Qin Hall, is particularly well preserved with original porch, doors, and interior spaces as well as a sculptured garden.

In addition, Taipei is home to approximately 2,000 wooden structures built during the Japanese rule of the island between 1895 and 1945, as well as some 4,000 trees that have been growing in their surrounding gardens since that time.

Transportation
The street area is accessible within walking distance west of Zhongxiao Xinsheng Station of Taipei Metro.

See also
 Taiwan under Japanese rule

References

Buildings and structures in Taipei
Houses in Taiwan